Women Are Like That is a 1938 American drama film directed by Stanley Logan and written by Horace Jackson. The film stars Kay Francis, Pat O'Brien, Ralph Forbes, Melville Cooper, Thurston Hall and Grant Mitchell. The film was released by Warner Bros. on April 24, 1938.

Plot
Businesswoman Claire King (Kay Francis) is the daughter of a powerful advertising executive. When she marries humble copywriter Bill Landin (Pat O'Brien), she wants to use her influence and connections to boost her husband's status and help him achieve success, but he resents her efforts. 

The couple nearly separates, but eventually see the error of their ways.

Cast    
 Kay Francis as Claire Landin
 Pat O'Brien as Bill Landin
 Ralph Forbes as Martin Brush
 Melville Cooper as Mainwaring
 Thurston Hall as Claudius King
 Grant Mitchell as Mr. Snell
 Gordon Oliver as Howard Johns
 John Eldredge as Charles Braden
 Herbert Rawlinson as Avery Flickner
 Hugh O'Connell as George Dunlap
 Georgia Caine as Mrs. Amelia Brush
 Joyce Compton as Miss Hall
 Sarah Edwards as Mrs. Snell
 Josephine Whittell as Miss Douglas
 Loia Cheaney as Miss Perkins
 Edward Broadley as Holliwell
 George O'Hanlon as Page (uncredited)

References

External links 
 
 
 
 

1938 films
Warner Bros. films
American drama films
1938 drama films
American black-and-white films
Films directed by Stanley Logan
1930s English-language films
1930s American films